Room 104 is an American television anthology series created by Mark Duplass and Jay Duplass. The series debuted on July 28, 2017, on HBO. A twelve-episode second season aired between November 9 and December 15, 2018. On February 8, 2019, HBO revealed that a third season had been filmed and that the network were in talks for a fourth season renewal. The show's twelve-episode third season premiered on September 13, 2019. Filming for season 4 was completed by September 2019. In May 2020, HBO announced that the fourth season would be its last and it premiered on July 24, 2020, and concluded on October 9, 2020.

Premise
The series is set in a single room of an American roadside motel, exploring characters who pass through it in each episode. Each episode is a different genre from horror and thriller to comedy.

Production
The series received a 24-episode order and all the episodes were shot back-to-back as a cost-saving measure, and they were split into two 12-episode seasons. In a December 2018 interview, co-creator Mark Duplass revealed that the third season had already been filmed and edited, and he was writing season 4. According to Duplass, episodes of Room 104 are made for "a quarter" of the cost typically expected for HBO series. Episodes are conceived in a "think tank" by the writers where they come up with dozens of ideas, and then they reach out to filmmakers that they are interested in to direct the episodes. Episodes are filmed in a "fast and loose" manner; for example, Josephine Decker directed her episode in two days only using an iPhone. For the editing process, directors do not receive final cut, and Duplass screens the episodes to a group of 20 people who work at their company for feedback.

Reception
Room 104 has received generally positive reviews from critics. On Metacritic, the first season has a score of 65 out of 100 based on 22 reviews. On Rotten Tomatoes, it has an 87% approval rating with an average score of 6.85 out of 10 based on 39 reviews. The site's critical consensus reads, "Room 104 uses its anthology structure to its advantage, telling a series of short, eclectic stories that hit their marks more often than they miss."

Reviewing the entire second season, Ben Travers of IndieWire gave it a positive review with a "B+" grade. He wrote, "the variety of storytelling on display builds such tingly anticipation, each new episode is worth it even when the narrative disappoints" and that it is "such remarkable, refreshing television that even when it's bad, it's good".

Episodes

Season 1 (2017)

Season 2 (2018)

Season 3 (2019)

Season 4 (2020)

See also
 Hotel Room, another HBO series with a similar premise, which aired in 1993
 Inside No. 9, a British series with a similar premise, produced by the BBC

References

External links
 
 

2017 American television series debuts
2010s American anthology television series
2010s American drama television series
2010s American horror television series
2020 American television series endings
2020s American anthology television series
2020s American drama television series
2020s American horror television series
English-language television shows
104
Magic realism television series
HBO original programming
American thriller television series
Horror drama television series
Television shows set in New York (state)
Television series set in hotels
Television series by Home Box Office
Television series by Duplass Brothers Productions